The Santaizi ATP Challenger is a tennis tournament held in Taipei City, Taiwan since 2014. The event is part of the ATP Challenger Tour and is played on indoor hard courts.

Past finals

Singles

Doubles

 
ATP Challenger Tour
Carpet court tennis tournaments
Tennis tournaments in Taiwan